Star Wars: X-Wing is a miniature war game designed by Jay Little and produced by Fantasy Flight Games that was released at Gen Con during August 17, 2012. It features tactical ship-to-ship dogfighting between various types of starfighters set in the fictional Star Wars universe. The game is said to be easy to learn and quick to play taking anywhere between 15 and 60 minutes from first set-up to battle's end. Each round both players give all their ships movement orders without knowing what their opponent is doing before resolving these orders while trying to shoot down enemy craft. On May 1, 2018, FFG announced X-Wing Second Edition, to be released on September 13, 2018. Although the physical models are transferable, an entire new set of rules, templates, and markers have been produced and are available through a new core set, waves, and conversion packs.

Game description from the publisher 
"X-Wing is a tactical ship-to-ship combat game in which players take control of powerful Rebel X-wing fighters and nimble Imperial TIE fighters, facing them against each other in fast-paced space combat. Featuring stunningly detailed and painted miniatures, X-Wing recreates exciting Star Wars space combat throughout its several included scenarios. Select your crew, plan your maneuvers, and complete your mission!

The X-Wing starter set includes everything you need to begin your battles, such as scenarios, cards, and fully assembled and painted ships. What's more, X-Wing quick-to-learn ruleset establishes the foundation for a system that can be expanded with your favorite ships and characters from the Star Wars universe."

First Edition Core game
The core set, which is required to play the game, includes one X-wing fighter miniature and two TIE fighter miniatures. The original core set uses X-wing and TIE fighter miniatures and pilots based on the original trilogy. A second edition of the core set with updated rules was released in 2015 as part of the promotion for Star Wars: The Force Awakens, featuring updated X-wing and TIE fighter miniatures and pilots from that movie. The Force Awakens Core Set also introduces sub-factions: The Resistance, a sub-faction of the Rebels and compatible with any Rebel ships, and the First Order, a sub-faction of the Imperials.

First Edition Expansions

Wave 1 
Released Date: September 14, 2012

X-Wing Expansion Pack

TIE Fighter Expansion Pack

Y-Wing Expansion Pack

TIE Advanced Expansion Pack

Wave 2 
Release date: March 1, 2013

Millennium Falcon Expansion Pack

Slave I Expansion Pack

A-Wing Expansion Pack

TIE Interceptor Expansion Pack

Wave 3 
Release date: September 13, 2013

B-Wing Expansion Pack

TIE Bomber Expansion Pack

HWK-290 Expansion Pack

Lambda-class Shuttle Expansion Pack

Wave 4 
Released Date: June 26, 2014

Z-95 Headhunter Expansion Pack

E-wing Expansion Pack

TIE Defender Expansion Pack

TIE Phantom Expansion Pack

Wave 5 
Released Date: November 26, 2014

YT-2400 Freighter Expansion Pack

VT-49 Decimator Expansion Pack

Wave 6 
Released Date: February 26, 2015

Most Wanted Expansion Pack

StarViper Expansion Pack

M3-A Scyk Interceptor Expansion Pack

IG-2000 Expansion Pack

Wave 7
Released Date: August 25, 2015

YV-666 Light Freighter (Hound's Tooth) Expansion Pack

Kihraxz Expansion Pack

K-Wing Expansion Pack

TIE Punisher Expansion Pack

Wave 8 
Release date: March 17, 2016

T-70 X-Wing Expansion Pack

TIE/fo Fighter Expansion Pack

VCX-100 (Ghost) Expansion Pack

TIE Advanced Prototype (Inquisitor's TIE) Expansion Pack

G-1A Starfighter (Mist Hunter) Expansion Pack

JumpMaster 5000 (Punishing One) Expansion Pack

Wave 9
Release date: September 23, 2016

ARC-170 Expansion Pack

Special Forces TIE Expansion Pack

Protectorate Starfighter Expansion Pack

Lancer-Class Pursuit Craft (Shadow Caster) Expansion Pack

Wave 10 
Release date:  February 2, 2017

Sabine's TIE Fighter Expansion Pack

Upsilon-Class Shuttle Expansion Pack

Quadjumper Expansion Pack

U-Wing Expansion Pack 
Release Date:  December 15, 2016

TIE Striker Expansion Pack 
Release Date:  December 15, 2016

Wave 11 
Release Date: July 13, 2017

TIE Aggressor Expansion Pack

Auzituck Gunship Expansion Pack

Scurrg H-6 Bomber Expansion Pack

Wave 12 
Released Date: December 8, 2017

Alpha-class Star Wing

Phantom II

M12-L Kimogila Fighter

Wave 13

TIE Silencer

Resistance Bomber

Wave 14

TIE Reaper

Saw's Renegades

Other Expansions

Imperial Aces 
Release date: March 14, 2014

Rebel Aces 
Release date: September 25, 2014

Imperial Veterans 
Release date: June 30, 2016

Heroes of the Resistance Expansion Pack
Release date: October 26, 2016

Guns for Hire Expansion Pack

GR75 Transport Expansion Pack 
Release date: April 30, 2014

CR90 Corvette Expansion Pack 
Release date: May 22, 2014

Imperial Raider Expansion Pack
Release date: August 13, 2015

Imperial Assault Carrier Expansion Pack
Release date: December 23, 2015

C-ROC Cruiser Expansion Pack
Release date: Q1 2017

Supplies/Accessories
X-Wing: Dice Pack
Star Wars Dice for iOS and Android - Dice rolling app
X-Wing: Death Star Assault Playmat
X-Wing: Starfield Playmat
X-Wing: Death Star II Playmat
X-Wing: Bespin Playmat
X-Wing: Starkiller Base Playmat
X-Wing: Battle of Hoth Playmat

See also
Star Wars Miniatures Battles

References

External links
 Game main site at Fantasy Flight
 
 Checklists of all Sets, Models and Cards from the X-Wing Game

Miniature wargames
Playscale miniaturism
Science fiction board wargames
Star Wars games
Wargames introduced in the 2010s